The following is a list of squads for each nation competing in women's football at the 2018 Asian Games in Palembang.

Group A

Chinese Taipei
The following is the Chinese Taipei squad in the women's football tournament of the 2018 Asian Games.

Head coach:  Hiroyuki Horino

Indonesia
The following is the Indonesia squad in the women's football tournament of the 2018 Asian Games.

Head Coach: Ijatna Satia Bagda

Maldives
The following is the Maldives squad in the women's football tournament of the 2018 Asian Games.

Head Coach: Athif Mohamed

South Korea
The following is the South Korea squad in the women's football tournament of the 2018 Asian Games. The team of 20 players was officially named on 19 July.

Head coach:  Yoon Deok-yeo

Group B

China PR
The following is the China squad in the women's football tournament of the 2018 Asian Games. The team of 20 players was officially named on 10 August.

Head coach:  Jia Xiuquan

Hong Kong
The following is the Hong Kong squad in the women's football tournament of the 2018 Asian Games.

Head coach:  José Ricardo Rambo

North Korea
The following is the North Korea squad in the women's football tournament of the 2018 Asian Games.

Head coach:  Kim Kwang-min

Tajikistan
The following is the Tajikistan squad in the women's football tournament of the 2018 Asian Games. The team of 18 players was officially named on 13 August.

Head coach: Kanoat Latipov

Group C

Japan
The following is the Japan squad in the women's football tournament of the 2018 Asian Games.

Head coach:  Asako Takakura

Thailand
The following is the Thailand squad in the women's football tournament of the 2018 Asian Games. The team of 20 players was officially named on 13 August.

Head coach: Nuengrutai Srathongvian

Vietnam
The following is the Vietnam squad in the women's football tournament of the 2018 Asian Games. The team of 20 players was officially named on 11 August.

Head coach: Mai Đức Chung

See also
 Football at the 2018 Asian Games – Men's team squads

References

External links

squads
2018